Northwestern Mari (Маре йӹлмӹ) is a Uralic language variety closely related to Hill Mari and Meadow Mari. With the first of them Northwestern Mari joins as a dialect group of Western Mari language. Northwestern Mari is the language of Northwestern Mari people, who live in Russia in the Yaransky, Tuzhinsky, Kiknursky, Sanchursky districts of Kirov Oblast, Tonshayevsky, Sharangsky and Tonkinsky districts of Nizhny Novgorod Oblast and partly in Kilemarsky and Medvedevsky districts of Mari El. It is written using the Northwestern Mari Cyrillic script, but doesn't have an official status in any subjects of Russian Federation.

Northwestern Mari people have difficulties with both other literary languages. The first book in Northwestern Mari,  (Northwestern Mari primer) was printed in 1995, and the dialect thereby became the third literary standard.

Dialects 
 Yaransk dialect – the largest by number of speakers and spread territory, Northwestern Mari standardized variety.
 Kiknur subdialect
 Tuzha subdialect
 Sanchursk subdialect
 Sharanga dialect – the closest to Hill Mari
 Tonshaevo dialect
 Lipsha dialect

Alphabet

Bibliography
 Moisio A., Saarinen S. Tscheremissisches Wörterbuch / Lexica Societatis Fenno-Ugricae, XXXII. Helsinki, 2008.
 Дмитриев С. Д., Дмитриева В. М., Тужаров Г. М. Маре букварь: (учебник для первого класса). Йошкар-Ола, 1995.
 Иванов И Г., Тужаров Г. М. Северо-западное наречие марийского языка / Диалекты марийского языка. Вып. I. Йошкар-Ола, 1970.
 Иванов И Г., Тужаров Г. М. Словарь северо-западного наречия марийского языка / Диалекты марийского языка. Вып. II. Йошкар-Ола, 1971.
 Utyatin A. Tatar borrowings in Sharanga dialect // XXII Международная студенческая конференция по финно-угроведению. Тезисы докладов.- Йошкар-Ола, 2006. – С. 23.

References

External links
 Pictures of Tonshaevo Mari people 

Mari language
Languages of Russia
Culture of Mari El